Trinity River may refer to:

Trinity River (California)
Trinity River (Texas)
Trinity River Audubon Center in Texas
Trinity River Authority in Texas
Trinity River National Wildlife Refuge in Texas
Trinity River Project in Texas
Trinity River Vision Project in Texas